Aq Tappeh (also Romanized as Āq Tappeh and Āqtappeh) is a village in Mahmudabad Rural District of the Central District of Shahin Dezh County, West Azerbaijan province, Iran. At the 2006 National Census, its population was 841 in 182 households. The following census in 2011 counted 1,071 people in 278 households. The latest census in 2016 showed a population of 1,267 people in 359 households; it was the largest village in its rural district.

References 

Shahin Dezh County

Populated places in West Azerbaijan Province

Populated places in Shahin Dezh County